Anil Mathur (born 8 November 1951) is an Indian former cricketer. He played first-class cricket for Delhi, Railways and Uttar Pradesh between 1970 and 1986.

See also
 List of Delhi cricketers

References

External links
 

1951 births
Living people
Indian cricketers
Delhi cricketers
Railways cricketers
Uttar Pradesh cricketers
Cricketers from Delhi